Twilight of the Renegades is the tenth album by American singer-songwriter Jimmy Webb, released in August 2005 by Sanctuary Records.

Production
Twilight of the Renegades was recorded at Sunset Sound, Cherokee Recording, and Calliope Studios in Los Angeles, California, and Right Track, Sound on Sound, and Jimmy Webb Music in New York City.

Release
Twilight of the Renegades was released in the United Kingdom in May 2005 before being released in the United States on August 16, 2005.

Critical response
In his review for AllMusic, William Ruhlmann gave the album a mixed review, welcoming the artist's "ambitious songwriting and arranging that characterized his classic work of the 1960s" while noting that "vocals remain the weak spot in the performing aspect of Webb's career". Ruhlmann continued:
 
While acknowledging that Webb's singing has improved over the years, he "continues to listen to him to hear a composer's individual interpretation of his work, rather than for definitive renditions of the songs". The AllMusic website gave the album four out of five stars.

Track listing

Personnel

Music
 Jimmy Webb – vocals, piano, keyboards, tambourine, producer
 Jeff Mironov – guitar
 Ira Seigel – guitar
 Dean Parks – guitar
 Beth Nielsen Chapman – guitar, background vocals
 Lisle Lette – guitar
 David Paich – keyboards
 Katherine LiVolsi Stern – violin
 Elena Barere – violin
 Vince Lionti – viola
 Larry Campbell – mandolin
 William Gallison – harmonica
 Jim Hynes – flugelhorn, trumpet
 Jeanne LeBlanc – cello
 Wolfram Koessel – cello
 Don Sanbeg – bass
 Lee Sklar – bass
 Jeff Porcaro – drums
 Paul Duskin – drums
 Jay Dittamo – drums, percussion
 Susan Webb – background vocals

Production
 Fred Mollin – producer
 Matthew McCauley – producer, synthesizer, string arrangements
 Chris Irwin – engineer, percussion, producer
 Kerry Cunningham – engineer, overdub engineer, shaker, programming, mastering, producer
 Mark Mandelbaum – engineer
 Kristopher Lewis – overdub engineer, assistant engineer
 Mark Linett – overdub engineer
 Jason Stasium – overdub engineer
 Bill Schnee – mixing
 Rob Mathes – string arrangements
 Mary Tiegreen – art direction
 Jill Dell'Abate – music contractor

References

2005 albums
Jimmy Webb albums
Sanctuary Records albums